The 1987 Cincinnati Bearcats football team represented the University of Cincinnati during the 1987 NCAA Division I-A football season. The Bearcats, led by head coach Dave Currey, participated as independent and played their home games at Nippert Stadium.

Schedule

References

Cincinnati
Cincinnati Bearcats football seasons
Cincinnati Bearcats football